Mayfield Road may refer to:
 Mayfield Road, Edinburgh, Scotland
 Mayfield Road, Edmonton, Alberta, Canada
 Peel Regional Road 14 in Brampton, Ontario, named Mayfield Road
 U.S. Route 322, known as Mayfield Road in Greater Cleveland, Ohio